Saint-Riquier-ès-Plains is a commune in the Seine-Maritime department in the Normandy region in northern France.

Geography

Population

Places of interest
 The church of St.Riquier, dating from the fourteenth century.

See also
Communes of the Seine-Maritime department

References

External links

Saint-Riquier-ès-Plains official website 

Communes of Seine-Maritime